Basissletta is a small, gently sloping, ice-covered plain between Pyramiden Nunatak and Stamnen Peak, near the southwest end of Ahlmann Ridge in Queen Maud Land. It was mapped by Norwegian cartographers from surveys and from air photos by the Norwegian-British-Swedish Antarctic Expedition (1949–1952), led by John Schjelderup Giæver and named "Basissletta" (the "base plain").

References
 

Plains of Queen Maud Land
Princess Martha Coast